Guivi "Gia" Sissaouri (born April 15, 1971) is a Canadian freestyle wrestler who lives and works in Canada.

Biography
Born in Tbilisi, Georgia, Sissaouri began wrestling at age ten.

Sissaouri won the silver medal at the 1996 Summer Olympics in the 57 kg class. He also won the gold at the 2001 world championships at Sofia, Bulgaria in the 58 kg class, a silver at the 1995 world championships in Atlanta, Georgia  in the 57 kg class, a bronze at the 1998 world championships at Tehran, Iran in the 58 kg class, and another bronze at the 1997 world championships at Krasnoyarsk, Russia also in the 58 kg class. In the 2002 Commonwealth Games he won a gold medal.

Sissaouri also appeared on season 12 of The Ultimate Fighter as Georges St-Pierre's wrestling coach.
He trains at the Montreal Wrestling Club.

References

External links
 CAWA Profile

1971 births
Living people
Wrestlers at the 1996 Summer Olympics
Wrestlers at the 2000 Summer Olympics
Wrestlers at the 2004 Summer Olympics
Canadian male sport wrestlers
Olympic wrestlers of Canada
Olympic silver medalists for Canada
Wrestlers at the 2002 Commonwealth Games
Commonwealth Games gold medallists for Canada
Georgian emigrants to Canada
Sportspeople from Tbilisi
Olympic medalists in wrestling
Medalists at the 1996 Summer Olympics
Wrestlers at the 2003 Pan American Games
Pan American Games silver medalists for Canada
Commonwealth Games medallists in wrestling
Pan American Games medalists in wrestling
World Wrestling Championships medalists
Medalists at the 2003 Pan American Games
World Wrestling Champions
Medallists at the 2002 Commonwealth Games